The 2021 Lafayette Leopards football team represented Lafayette College in the 2021 NCAA Division I FCS football season. The Leopards, led by fifth-year head coach John Garrett, played their home games at Fisher Stadium as a member of the Patriot League.

Schedule

References

Lafayette
Lafayette Leopards football seasons
Lafayette Leopards football